Miroslav Krstić (Serbian Cyrillic: Мирослав Крстић) is a Serbian-born American control theorist and Distinguished Professor of Mechanical and Aerospace Engineering at the University of California, San Diego (UCSD). Krstić is also the director of the Center for Control Systems and Dynamics at UCSD and a Senior Associate Vice Chancellor for Research.

Biography
Krstić was born on 14 September 1964 in Pirot, Serbia (then part of SFR Yugoslavia). He received a BSc degree in Electrical Engineering from the University of Belgrade in 1989 and a MSc in 1992. He completed his PhD at the University of California, Santa Barbara in 1994.

Krstić was assistant professor in the Department of Mechanical Engineering at the University of Maryland from 1995 to 1997. He moved to University of California, San Diego (UCSD) as associate professor in 1997. Since 2006 he has been the director of the Center for Control Systems and Dynamics and since 2012 he has served as Senior Associate Vice-Chancellor for Research at UCSD. In 2015 he was promoted to the rank of Distinguished Professor.

Work
Krstić has made significant contributions to adaptive control, nonlinear control, stochastic systems, extremum seeking, and boundary control of partial differential equations. His control designs have had impact in several processes, including oil drilling, nuclear fusion, and semiconductor manufacturing.

In 2015, Krstić's colleagues published a monograph on the latest innovations in nonlinear delay systems, as a tribute to his research.

Krstić is a co-author of 18 books and more than 400 journal papers. 

He is among the most highly cited researchers in the field of control systems according to Scopus and Google Scholar, with an h-index well over 100. His 1995 research monograph Nonlinear and Adaptive Control Design is one of the two most cited in the field of control theory. 

Krstić is Editor-in-Chief of Systems & Control Letters and has been senior editor in the leading journals in control theory, Automatica and IEEE Transactions on Automatic Control.

Awards
Krstic is the recipient of numerous awards, including:

A. V. Balakrishnan Award
Richard E. Bellman Control Heritage Award
Rufus Oldenburger Medal
W. T. and Idalia Reid Prize
A. V. "Bal" Balakrishnan Award for Research in Mathematics of Systems
John Ragazzini Education Award 
Harold Chestnut Control Engineering Textbook Prize 
IFAC TC Award on Non-Linear Control Systems
ASME Henry Paynter Outstanding Investigator Award
Nyquist Lecture
IEEE Control Systems Society Distinguished Member Award
First engineering recipient of the UC San Diego Chancellor's Associates Award for Excellence in Science & Engineering Research (immediately following the Nobel laureate Roger Tsien)
Presidential Early Career Award for Scientists and Engineers
Office of Naval Research Young Investigator Award
National Science Foundation Career Award
George Axelby Outstanding Paper Award (IEEE Transactions on Automatic Control)
O. Hugo Schuck Best Paper Award (1996 and 2019)
Foreign Member, Serbian Academy of Sciences and Arts

Krstic is Fellow of the Institute of Electrical and Electronics Engineers, International Federation of Automatic Control, Society for Industrial and Applied Mathematics, American Society of Mechanical Engineers, Institution of Engineering and Technology, American Association for the Advancement of Science as well as an associate fellow of the American Institute of Aeronautics and Astronautics.

Selected bibliography

Books
Nonlinear and Adaptive Control Design (1995), co-authored with Ioannis Kanellakopoulos and Petar Kokotovic; John Wiley and Sons. 
Stabilization of Nonlinear Uncertain Systems (1998), co-authored with Hua Deng; Springer. 
Flow Control by Feedback (2002), co-authored with Ole Morten Aamo; Springer. ISBN 1-85233-669-2
Real-Time Optimization by Extremum Seeking Feedback (2003), co-authored with Kartik B. Ariyur; John Wiley and Sons. 
Control of Turbulent and Magnetohydrodynamic Channel Flows (2007), co-authored with Rafael Vazquez; Birkhauser. 
Boundary Control of PDEs: A Course on Backstepping Designs (2008), co-authored with Andrey Smyshlyaev; SIAM. ISBN 978-0-89871-650-4
Delay Compensation for Nonlinear, Adaptive, and PDE Systems (2009); Birkhauser. 
Adaptive Control of Parabolic PDEs (2010), co-authored with Andrey Smyshlyaev; Princeton University Press. ISBN 978-0691142869
Stochastic Averaging and Stochastic Extremum Seeking (2012), co-authored with Shu-Jun Liu; Springer. ISBN 978-1-4471-4086-3
Nonlinear Control Under Nonconstant Delays (2013), co-authored with Nikolaos Bekiaris-Liberis; SIAM. 
Predictor Feedback for Delay Systems: Implementations and Approximations (2017), coauthored with Iasson Karafyllis; Birkhauser, ISBN 978-3-319-42377-7
Model-Free Stabilization by Extremum Seeking (2017), co-authored with Alexander Scheinker; Springer. 
Input-to-State Stability for PDEs (2018), co-authored with Iasson Karafyllis; Springer. 
Delay-Adaptive Linear Control (2019), co-authored with Yang Zhu; Princeton University Press. ISBN 9780691202549
Materials Phase Change PDE Control & Estimation: From Additive Manufacturing to Polar Ice (2020), co-authored with Shumon Koga; Springer. 
PDE Control of String-Actuated Motion (2022); co-authored with Ji Wang, Princeton University Press. ISBN 9780691233499
Extremum Seeking through Delays and PDEs (2022), co-authored with Tiago Roux Oliveira, SIAM.
Traffic Congestion Control by PDE Backstepping (2023), co-authored with Huan Yu, Birkhäuser.

References

External links
 Home page of Miroslav Krstic

Control theorists
Living people
University of Belgrade School of Electrical Engineering alumni
American people of Serbian descent
Fellow Members of the IEEE
Fellows of the American Society of Mechanical Engineers
Fellows of the Society for Industrial and Applied Mathematics
Fellows of the International Federation of Automatic Control
University of California, Santa Barbara alumni
University of California, San Diego faculty
1964 births
Engineers from California
Richard E. Bellman Control Heritage Award recipients